Jack, or The Submission is an absurdist play by Eugène Ionesco, the first of two about Jack and his family (the second being The Future is in Eggs), all of whom are named after Jack (Father Jack, Mother Jack, etc.).

The thrust of the narrative involves Jack's arranged marriage to Roberta and, when the first Roberta is not satisfactory, Roberta II.  The play contains nonsensical exchanges and strings of clichés, similar to The Bald Soprano, and the sort of surreal conceits (Roberta's multiple noses, for example) common in many of Ionesco's later plays.

References
 Allen, Donald M., trans. 1958. The Bald Soprano and Other Plays: The Bald Soprano; The Lesson; Jack, or The Submission; The Chairs. By Eugène Ionesco. New York: Grove Weidenfeld, 1982. .

Plays by Eugène Ionesco
1955 plays
French plays
Theatre of the Absurd
One-act plays